Naval War College is a college located in Yuseong-gu, South Korea.

References

Yuseong District
Naval academies
Republic of Korea Navy
Military academies of South Korea
Universities and colleges in Daejeon
Educational institutions established in 1955
1955 establishments in South Korea